Peter Jones & Partners (formerly and commonly known as Peter Jones) is a large department store in central London. It is owned by John Lewis & Partners and located in Sloane Square, Chelsea. The store also holds two Royal Warrant's granted by Charles, then Prince of Wales and Prince Philip, Duke of Edinburgh.

History 
The shop is named after Peter Rees Jones (1842–1905), the son of a Carmarthenshire hat manufacturer. After serving an apprenticeship with a draper in Cardigan, Jones moved to London and established a small shop in Marylebone Lane. He then moved to central London, and in 1877, he moved to 4–6 King's Road, the current site of the  store. The business flourished, soon expanding to cover most of the block, occupied on a 999-year lease from the Cadogan estate at £6,000 per year, the terms of which have never been increased. 

After a period of troubled trading and Jones' death, the store was purchased by John Lewis of the eponymous Oxford Street store, who handed it over to his son John Spedan Lewis in 1914. Soon after, it became part of the John Lewis profit sharing partnership. 

The present building, which occupies an entire island site on the west side of Sloane Square, was built between 1932 and 1936 to designs by William Crabtree of the firm of Slater, Crabtree and Moberly. The building is the first modern-movement use of the glass curtain wall in Britain (not, as is often claimed, the first per se, as late-Victorian examples in the Gothic Revival style exist) and is now a Grade II* listed building.

The store completed a lengthy refurbishment by John McAslan and Partners in 2004. In 2009, Simon Fowler was appointed Managing Director, overseeing a two-year period of growth where sales and profits reached record levels.  This period also spanned Peter Jones' 100th anniversary of its membership at the John Lewis Partnership, where it is widely recognised to be the birthplace of the democratic employee ownership structure still found in the retailer today. Tony Wheeler was appointed Managing Director of the store in 2011.

References

External links

Official website of Peter Jones

Architects John McAslan + Partners

1877 establishments in England
Buildings and structures completed in 1936
Jones Peter
Jones Peter
Grade II* listed buildings in the Royal Borough of Kensington and Chelsea
Grade II* listed retail buildings
Shops in London
British Royal Warrant holders
Tourist attractions in the Royal Borough of Kensington and Chelsea
Art Deco architecture in London
Retail companies established in 1877
British companies established in 1877
Department store buildings in the United Kingdom
History of the Royal Borough of Kensington and Chelsea